Zhumagul Baltabaevna Nusupova (17 May 1931 — 28 November 2015) was a Soviet-Kyrgyzstani Politician (Communist).

She served as Minister of Culture from 1980 to 1985.

References

1931 births
2015 deaths
20th-century Kyrgyzstani women politicians
20th-century Kyrgyzstani politicians
Soviet women in politics
Kyrgyzstani communists
Women government ministers of Kyrgyzstan
Recipients of the Order of the Red Banner of Labour